Öckerö is an island and a locality and the seat of Öckerö Municipality, Västra Götaland County, Sweden with 3,488 inhabitants in 2010.

Sports
The following sports clubs are located in Öckerö:

 Öckerö IF

References

External links 
 

Coastal cities and towns in Sweden
Islands of Sweden
Municipal seats of Västra Götaland County
Populated places in Öckerö Municipality
Populated places in Västra Götaland County
Swedish municipal seats